Willy Mairesse (1 October 1928 – 2 September 1969) was a Formula One and sports-car driver from Belgium.  He participated in 13 World Championship Grands Prix, debuting on 19 June 1960.  He achieved one podium and scored a total of seven championship points. He committed suicide in a hotel room in Ostend after a crash at the 1968 24 Hours of Le Mans forced an end to his career.

Peter Revson once described the intensity of Mairesse before a race at Spa, Belgium. Revson looked into his car and saw Mairesse's "furrowed" face, beetled brows, and eyes which were almost tilted and their colour changed. "It was almost like looking at the devil."

Sports car driver

Mairesse won first place in the marathon rally Liege-Rome-Liege in 1956.
Mairesse secured third place in the Grand Prix of Monza in June 1959. Driving a Ferrari, he placed behind Alfonso Thiele and Carlo Mario Abate, both also in Ferraris. Mairesse and Mike Parkes of England finished second to Phil Hill and Olivier Gendebien at the 1961 24 Hours of Le Mans. Driving a Ferrari, Mairesse and Parkes also eclipsed the previous Le Mans record, covering 2,758.66 miles. In the 1963 12 Hours of Sebring Mairesse and Nino Vacarella placed second after Ludovico Scarfiotti and John Surtees. Both teams drove Ferraris. Surtees and Mairesse won the 1000 km of the Nurburgring driving a Ferrari 250P. Thereafter, Surtees and Mairesse led for the  15 hours of the first 18 hours of the 1963 24 Hours of Le Mans before the car caught fire while Mairesse was driving.  Mairesse escaped injury. Scarfiotti and Lorenzo Bandini won on the French circuit where Christian Heins had a fatal accident. Mairesse and Surtees retired after a motor fire. A young German Red Cross worker was killed in August 1963 when the wheel of a Ferrari driven by Mairesse came off as his car overturned. Guenther Schneider, 19, was hit by a flying wheel during the running of the German Grand Prix at the Nürburgring and died. Mairesse was triumphant in the 1964 Grand Prix of Angola, run at Luanda. His average speed was 80.78 miles per hour. Mairesse piloted a Ferrari 250 LM to first place in the 500 km sportscar race of Spa in May 1965. He completed the race in 2 hours, 29 minutes, and 45.7 seconds. He achieved an average speed of 126.29. Mairesse and Jean Beurlys of France finished third at the 1965 24 Hours of Le Mans in a Ferrari 275 GTB winning the GT category in its debut at Le Mans, while Masten Gregory and Jochen Rindt won the race. In April 1966 Surtees and Parkes won the 1,000 kilometer Monza Auto Race. Mairesse and Herbert Mueller of Switzerland came in third in a Ford sports car, two laps behind. In May Mairesse and Mueller drove to victory in the Targa Florio, driving a Porsche Carrera 6. Rain caused considerable attrition as only thirteen of seventy starters finished the race. Mairesse and Beurlys again drove a Ferrari to third place in the 1967 24 Hours of Le Mans. This event was won by the American team
of Dan Gurney and A. J. Foyt.

Formula One
Mairesse was third in the Grand Prix of Europe, 1960 Italian Grand Prix. This was the penultimate race of the 1960 Formula One World Championship. Run at the Autodromo Nazionale Monza, Phil Hill was victorious, with Richie Ginther second, and Mairesse third, a lap down. Mairesse qualified fifth for the 1962 Belgian Grand Prix at Spa. The pole was won by Graham Hill in a BRM. During the event Mairesse
and the Lotus of Trevor Taylor dueled for more than an hour, passing and repassing a number of times each lap. Mairesse was
cheered heartily by an enthusiastic partisan crowd. The two cars came together at more than 100 miles per hour in the long, sweeping,
left-hand Blanchimont turn. Mairesse's car went off to the left, careening into a hillside behind a ditch, and caught fire after flipping over. He was thrown out of his Ferrari and his shoes and the legs of his trousers were torn off. He was conscious, despite numerous scrapes, cuts, and burns. Mairesse was loaded into an ambulance and transported to a hospital, where he was reported to be in good spirits and without any serious injuries. Taylor and Mairesse made contact earlier in the season at the Grand Prix of Brussels. In a race in which only twelve of twenty-one starters finished, Mairesse came in fourth in the 1962 Italian Grand Prix. He was only a car length ahead of Giancarlo Baghetti.

Out of Formula One in 1963, Phil Hill predicted a rough future for the Ferrari team. He said there was too much competition between Mairesse and Surtees. Specifically, he commented "they will harry each other so much that they will force each other to make mistakes". Mairesse's car crashed during the 1963 German Grand Prix. The Ferrari turned over multiple times after swerving off the track. He was rushed to the hospital with a broken arm. His teammate, Surtees, won the race, with Jim Clark second in a Lotus.

Racing record

Complete Formula One World Championship results
(key) (Races in bold indicate pole position)

Non-Championship Formula One results
(key) (Races in bold indicate pole position)
(Races in italics indicate fastest lap)

References

1928 births
1969 suicides
Belgian racing drivers
Belgian Formula One drivers
Ferrari Formula One drivers
Ecurie Nationale Belge Formula One drivers
Team Lotus Formula One drivers
Scuderia Centro Sud Formula One drivers
24 Hours of Le Mans drivers
12 Hours of Reims drivers
World Sportscar Championship drivers
Suicides in Belgium
Place of birth missing